The 2000 Rugby League World Cup knockout stage took place after the group stage of the 2000 Rugby League World Cup and culminated in the 2000 Rugby League World Cup Final. The quarter-finals consisted of eight teams; the top two teams from each group; Group A, Group B, Group C and Group D.

Bracket

Quarter-finals

Quarter-final 1: Australia vs Samoa

Quarter-final 2: England vs Ireland

England:1. Paul Wellens, 2. Chev Walker, 3. Kris Radlinski, 4. Keith Senior, 5. Darren Rogers, 6. Sean Long, 7. Paul Deacon8. Stuart Fielden, 9. Paul Rowley, 10. Paul Anderson, 11. Adrian Morley, 12. Mike Forshaw, 13. Andy Farrell.Substitutes: 14. Tony Smith, 15. Scott Naylor, 16. Jamie Peacock, 17. Harvey Howard .Coach: John Kear

Ireland1. Steve Prescott, 2. Brian Carney, 3. Michael Withers, 4. Michael Eagar, 5. Mark Forster, 6. Tommy Martyn, 7. Ryan Sheridan8. Terry O'Connor, 9. Danny Williams, 10. Barrie McDermott, 11. Chris Joynt, 12. Kevin Campion, 13. Luke RicketsonSubstitutes: Clinch, Mathiou, Barnhill, Southern. Coach: Steve O'Neill Andy Kelly

Quarter-final 3: New Zealand vs France

Quarter-final 4: Wales vs Papua New Guinea

Semi-finals

Semi-final 1: New Zealand vs England
This was the England rugby league team's biggest ever loss. By winning this match, New Zealand had again equaled their record for consecutive victories with five.

Semi-final 2: Australia vs Wales
Wales became the first team in 12 months to score more than two tries against Australia.

Final

References

2000 Rugby League World Cup